A political constitution is a constitution where the legislature is the main check upon executive power. It can be contrasted to a legal constitution, where it is the judiciary which provides the greater checks upon government. In many countries both political and legal checks will be used to control the government.

References

External links
Political v Legal constitutionism

Political terminology